A prison officer or corrections officer also known as a Correctional Law Enforcement Officer is a uniformed law enforcement official responsible for the custody, supervision, safety, and regulation of prisoners. They are responsible for the care, custody, and control of individuals who have been convicted of a crime and sentenced to imprisonment. They are also responsible for the security of the facility and its property as well as other law enforcement functions. Most prison officers or corrections officers are employed by the government of the jurisdiction in which they operate, although some are employed by private companies that provide prison services to the government.

Terms for the role 

Historically, terms such as "jailer" (also spelled "gaoler"), "guard" and "warder" have all been used.

The term "prison officer" is now used for the role in the UK and Ireland. It is the official English title in Denmark, Finland, and Sweden.

The term "corrections officer" or "correction officer" is used in the U.S. and New Zealand.

The term "Correctional Police Officer" or "CPO" is used in New Jersey. Due to the law enforcement status and authority of New Jersey's officers, New Jersey's officers employed by the Department of Corrections are classified as "Police Officers".

"Correctional officer" is used in Australia, Canada, Jamaica, and the U.S.

In Australia, prison officers were known as turnkeys until the 19th century after which they were known as warders until the late 20th century. Additionally, a slang term used as an insult or form of group endearment during this period was 'screws'. Following this period they were known as prison officers and later correctional officers.

"Detention officer" is used in the U.S., as is the term "penal officer".

The official who is in charge of a specific prison is known by various titles, including: "warden" (US and Canada), "governor" (UK and Australia), "superintendent" (South Asia) or "director" (New Zealand), respectively "Direktor" or "Gefängnisdirektor" (Germany).

Duties 

Prison officers must maintain order and daily operations of the facility and are responsible for the care, custody, and control of inmates. A correction officer has a responsibility to control inmates who may be dangerous, and that society themselves do not wish to accommodate. An officer must always prevent disturbances, assaults, and escapes by supervising activities and work assignments of inmates. Officers have a responsibility to protect themselves, other officers, inmates, and the public from assault by other inmates. Correctional officers must also protect inmates from harming themselves or committing suicide. An officer must be alert and aware of any and all movement taking place inside the facility. 

Prevention is one of the key components of an officer's duties. Officers can utilize prevention by routinely searching inmates and their living quarters for potential threats such as weapons, drugs, or other contraband. Officers should remain assertive and in most situations refuse to back down. An officer shall hold offenders who violate facility policy accountable for their actions when rules are violated. This is usually done through on the spot corrections, a formal disciplinary process, or through the legal process in extreme circumstances. Correction officers must take full concern for the health and safety of the facility. Officers check for unsanitary conditions, fire hazards, and/or any evidence of tampering or damage to locks, bars, grilles, doors, and gates. Fire and severe weather drills may be common. Officers may screen all incoming and outgoing mail for select high risk offenders. 

All prison staff, regardless of position, volunteers, visitors, new court commit, and offenders returning from off ground, are searched prior to entry. This aides in the reduction of contraband being introduced into the facility. These routine searches often employ hand held or walk through metal detectors, and baggage x-ray machines. Under certain instances, a canine, pat/frisk, full strip, and vehicle (if parked on facility grounds) search may be conducted. Correction officers are responsible for transporting inmates to other facilities, medical appointments, court appearances, and other approved locations. In the US, these trips are most often local, but may be across the entire country. Correction officers may assist police officers on/off duty depending on their peace officer status and jurisdiction.

Training 

Corrections officers' training will vary from jurisdiction to jurisdiction as well as facility to facility depending on the legislated power given, the nature of the facilities, or even the socioeconomics of the region. Training may be provided by external agencies or at the facility with a peer-group or supervisor instructor.

In North America, standard training usually includes:
 Use of force and restraints (i.e., handcuffs, leg-irons, belly-chains, etc.)
 Weapons (firearms, taser, pepper spray, baton, etc.)
 Self-defense
 First aid and CPR
 Report writing
 Giving testimony in court
 Defusing hostility
 Interpersonal communication
 Correction law
 Criminal law
 Criminal procedure law
 Case work and criminal investigations
 Hostage negotiation
 Gang intelligence

Many jurisdictions have also, in recent years, expanded basic training to include:
 Suicide prevention/crisis intervention
 Mental health awareness
 Critical incident stress management
 Occupational Safety and Health Act (U.S.) or Workplace Hazardous Materials Information System (Canada)
 Gang awareness and intervention
 Crisis or hostage negotiation
 Drug abuse training
 Rehabilitation programs
 Rapid response training
 Prison Rape Elimination Act of 2003
 Diversity, Equity, and Inclusion (DEI)
 Staff wellness

Most institutions in the United States have a crisis resolution team of some sort, though these vary in name (i.e., Crisis Resolution Team or CRT, Special Response Team or SRT, Correctional Emergency Response Team or CERT, Crisis and Emergency Response Team also CERT, Special Security Team or SST, Disturbance Control Team or DCT, Special Operations And Response Team or SORT). These teams take on a role similar to a police SWAT team, but are tailored to the prison setting. Though these vary greatly from jurisdiction to jurisdiction, they typically must pass a very physically demanding course lasting a week or more.

See also 

 Police officer
 Bailiff (Ontario, Canada)
 Correctional Emergency Response Team
 Correctional Service of Canada
 Federal Bureau of Prisons (U.S.)
 His Majesty's Prison Service (UK)
 Irish Prison Service
 Justizwache (Austria)
 Law enforcement officer
 Ministry of Community Safety and Correctional Services (Ontario, Canada)
 New York State Department of Corrections and Community Supervision
 New Zealand Police Negotiation Team
 Northern Ireland Prison Service
 Probation and Parole officer
 Psychiatric technician
 Punjab Prisons (Pakistan)
 Scottish Prison Service
 Deputy Sheriff (United States)
 Texas Department of Criminal Justice
 Wisconsin Department of Corrections

References

Citations

Sources 

 Davenport, D. K. (2001). State of Arizona Office of the Auditor General Performance Audit: Arizona Department of Corrections. Sunset Factors Retrieved 8 March 2008 from http://www.auditorgen.state.az.us/Reports/State_Agencies/Agencies/Corrections
 Tracy, S. J. (2004). The construction of correctional officers: Layers of emotionality behind bars. Qualitative Inquiry, 10, 509–533.
 Tracy, S. J., Meyers, K., & Scott, C. (2007). Cracking jokes and crafting selves: Sensemaking and identity management among human service workers. Communication Monographs, 73, 283–308.
 Correctional Service of Canada; Correctional Officers and Their First Year: An Empirical Investigation

External links 
 

Law enforcement occupations